Emiliano Mathias Tellechea (born 5 July 1987 in Montevideo) is a Uruguayan footballer playing for Argentine club Argentino de Monte Maiz.

Honours

Copa Libertadores Runner Up (1): 2016

References

External links
 Player profile 
 
 

1987 births
Living people
Uruguayan footballers
Uruguayan expatriate footballers
Montevideo Wanderers F.C. players
San Lorenzo de Almagro footballers
Defensa y Justicia footballers
Instituto footballers
C.S.D. Independiente del Valle footballers
Olimpo footballers
Club Agropecuario Argentino players
Nueva Chicago footballers
Uruguayan Primera División players
Argentine Primera División players
Primera Nacional players
Ecuadorian Serie A players
Association football midfielders
Uruguayan expatriate sportspeople in Argentina
Uruguayan expatriate sportspeople in Ecuador
Expatriate footballers in Argentina
Expatriate footballers in Ecuador